Der yidisher komunist ('The Jewish Communist') was a short-lived Yiddish language newspaper published from Gomel. It was founded as a weekly newspaper in June 1919. It was the organ of the Yevsektsiya (Jewish Section of the Communist Party) in Gomel.

References

Gomel
Jewish anti-Zionism in Belarus
Jewish anti-Zionism in the Soviet Union
Publications established in 1919
Secular Jewish culture in Europe
Yiddish communist newspapers
Yiddish culture in Belarus